Caccuri is a comune and town in the province of Crotone in Calabria, southern Italy.

It is the birthplace of Renaissance statesman Cicco Simonetta.

Main sights

Caccuri castle, built over Byzantine fortress dating to the 6th century. It was restored several times, the last in 1885. The most visible element is the only tower, called Torre Mastrigli, which is the town's symbol. Currently a great part of the castle is in a state of decay. The feudal chapel houses Neapolitan school artworks. 
Mother church (St. Mary of Graces). Of medieval origins but rebuilt in the 15th century, it lies in the historical centre. It was damaged by the  earthquakes of 1638 and 1808. The church has a nave and two aisles.
Church of Santa Maria del Soccorso (16th century). It houses a  Baroque altar with a statue of St. Dominic.
Canalaci Fountain (1884)
St. Roch sanctuary

References

Cities and towns in Calabria